Parisopalpus is a genus of false blister beetles in the family Oedemeridae. The genus was first identified by Logan Hudson in 1975, who separated the group from Sessinia due to the presence of bifid mandibles, and n males of the species visible genitalia.

Species are primarily found in Australia and New Zealand. In 2012, a new species was identified in Chile, Parisopalpus defoei.

Species
Currently four species belong to the genus Parisopalpus.

 Parisopalpus defoei 
 Parisopalpus macleayi 
 Parisopalpus nigronotatus 
 Parisopalpus thoracicus

Gallery

References

External links

 

Oedemeridae